Václav Fischer (born 22 June 1954) is a Czech-German businessman and politician. He was the founder of the companies CK Fischer and Fischer Air.

He attended the Prague University of Economics and Business. After graduating from Internal Commerce Studies, Fischer moved to Switzerland for a short time, then he based in Berlin (then West Germany) and Hamburg, where he worked for some travel agencies and a shipping company. In 1980 Fischer founded in Germany his own travel agency called Fischer Reisen. Due to his success, after the Velvet Revolution that ended the Czechoslovak communist dictatorship, Fischer decided to return to Czechoslovakia to establish the subsidiaries of his companies in the country, as well as to expand to other Central European countries, such as Hungary, Slovakia and Poland.

In 1995, he acquired some air routes of the airline Condor Flugdienst to create his own company, Fischer Air.

Fischer won a seat in the Senate of the Czech Republic in the 1999 by-election for the Prague 1 with 71.24% of the votes. Fischer is the first openly gay Czech parliamentarian.

References

External links 

  Václav Fischer's profile in the Parliament of the Czech Republic

1954 births
Businesspeople from Prague
Members of the Senate of the Czech Republic
Czech LGBT businesspeople
Czech LGBT politicians
Czech gay men
Politicians from Prague
Czech people of German descent
Prague University of Economics and Business alumni
Living people
LGBT legislators
Gay politicians
Gay businessmen
German businesspeople in transport

LGBT Christians